Jin So-yeon is a South Korean actress and model. She is known for her roles in drama Touch Your Heart and in movies Hot Young Bloods and #Alive.

Filmography

Television series

Film

References

External links
 
 

1991 births
Living people
21st-century South Korean actresses
South Korean female models
South Korean television actresses
South Korean film actresses
South Korean web series actresses